Abdel Halim Ali Abdel Halim (born 24 October 1973) is an Egyptian retired footballer who played as a striker.

Honours and achievements

Club
Zamalek
Egyptian Premier League: 2000–01, 2002–03, 2003–04
Egypt Cup: 2002, 2008
Egyptian Super Cup: 2001, 2002
CAF Champions League: 2002
African Cup Winners' Cup: 2000
CAF Super Cup: 2003
Arab Champions Cup: 2003
Saudi-Egyptian Super Cup: 2003

International
Egypt
African Cup of Nations: 2006
World Military Cup: 2001
African Military Cup: 2004

References

External links

1973 births
Living people
Egyptian footballers
Egypt international footballers
Association football forwards
Eastern Company SC players
Zamalek SC players
Sportspeople from Giza
2000 African Cup of Nations players
2004 African Cup of Nations players
2006 Africa Cup of Nations players
Egyptian Premier League players